The 9th Air Command (Serbo-Croatian: 9. vazduhoplovna komanda/ 9.  ваздухопловна команда) was a joint unit of Yugoslav Air Force.

History
It was established by the order from June 27, 1959, year due to the "Drvar" reorganization plan of Yugoslav Air Force from the 21st Aviation Division with command at Mostar. In 1961 it suffered a changes in the organization.

By the new "Drvar 2" reorganization plan of Yugoslav Air Force, 3rd Air Command has been disbanded. Its units were attached to 5th Aviation Corps.

The commanders of Air command was Radoje Ljubić.

Organization

1959-1961
5th Air Command
229th Signal Battalion
Liaison Squadron of 9th Air Command
Light Combat Aviation Squadron of 9th Air Command
122nd Hydroplane Liaison Squadron
16th Reconnaissance Squadron of Anti-Aircraft Artillery
83rd Fighter Aviation Regiment
172nd Fighter-Bomber Aviation Regiment
97th Support Aviation Regiment
84th Air Base
171st Air Base
423rd Air Base

1961-1964
5th Air Command
229th Signal Battalion
893rd Liaison Aviation Squadron
678th Transport Aviation Squadron
122nd Hydroplane Liaison Squadron
16th Reconnaissance Squadron of Anti-Aircraft Artillery
83rd Fighter Aviation Regiment
172nd Fighter-Bomber Aviation Regiment
97th Support Aviation Regiment 
84th Air Base
171st Air Base
423rd Air Base

Headquarters
Mostar

Commanding officers 
Colonel Radoje Ljubić

References 
Notes and citations

Bibliography
 

Air Commands of Yugoslav Air Force
Military units and formations established in 1959